HMCS Columbia was a  that served in the Royal Canadian Navy and later the Canadian Forces from 1959 to 1974. Columbia was the seventh and final ship in her class and is the second Canadian naval unit to carry the name . Following her service, she was kept at Esquimalt in an altered condition, no longer capable of sailing. During the summer of 1974 she along with her sister ship HMCS Chaudiere served as the base of operations for the Esquimalt Sea Cadet Camp while being docked at the DND jetty in Colwood. This location was across the harbour from the main site of CFB Esquimalt.  Columbia was sold for use as an artificial reef and sunk off the coast of British Columbia in 1996.

Design and description
Based on the preceding  design, the Restigouches had the same hull and propulsion, but different weaponry. Initially the St. Laurent class had been planned to be 14 ships. However the order was halved, and the following seven were redesigned to take into improvements made on the St. Laurents. As time passed, their design diverged further from that of the St. Laurents.

The Restigouches had a complement of 214.

The Restigouches were by powered by two English Electric geared steam turbines, each driving a propeller shaft, using steam provided by two Babcock & Wilcox boilers.

The Restigouches were equipped with SPS-10, SPS-12, Sperry Mk 2 and SPG-48 radar along with SQS-501 and SQS-503 sonar.

Armament
The Restigouches diverged from the St. Laurents in their weaponry. The Restigouches were equipped with two twin mounts of Vickers /70 calibre Mk 6 dual-purpose guns forward and maintained a single twin mount of 3-inch/50 calibre Mk 22 guns aft used in the preceding class. A Mk 69 fire control director was added to control the new guns. They were also armed with two Limbo Mk 10 mortars and two single Bofors 40 mm guns. However the 40 mm guns were dropped in the final design.

From 1958 the destroyers were also equipped with Mk 43 homing torpedoes in an effort to increase the effective range of the armament. They were launched by a modified depth charge thrower.

Service history
Columbia was laid down on 11 June 1953 at Burrard Dry Dock in North Vancouver, British Columbia. Named for the Columbia River that flows from British Columbia into the United States, Columbia was launched on 1 November 1956. She was commissioned into the Royal Canadian Navy on 7 November 1959 with the classification DDE 260.

Columbia transferred to the east coast and in 1960 and was assigned to the Fifth Canadian Escort Squadron. The aircraft had been training with Columbia and sister ship . She was present for Nigeria's Independence ceremonies at Lagos on 1 November. In March 1961, the destroyer escort was among the ships that took part in a combined naval exercise with the United States Navy off Nova Scotia.

During the reorganization of the fleet following the unification of the Canadian Armed Forces and the creation of Maritime Command, Columbia was transferred back to the Pacific as part of the Second Canadian Escort Squadron.

Columbia was paid off on 18 February 1974. Placed in reserve, the ship was fitted so that she could run her engines at dockside for use as a training ship. The ship was sold to the Artificial Reef Society of British Columbia and sunk as an artificial reef near Campbell River, British Columbia in June 1996.

References

Notes

Citations

Sources

External links
Canadian Navy of Yesterday & Today: Restigouche-class destroyer escort

Restigouche-class destroyers
Cold War destroyers of Canada
Shipwrecks of the British Columbia coast
1956 ships